Vjekoslav Pasković (born 23 March 1985 in Tivat, Montenegro) is a Montenegrin water polo player. He is a member of the Montenegro men's national water polo team at the 2008 Summer Olympics. The team reached the semifinals, where they were defeated by Hungary in the semifinal and finished fourth after losing to Serbia in the bronze medal match.  He was also part of the team at the 2012 Olympics, where Montenegro again reached the semifinals, losing to Croatia this time, and then they again lost to Serbia in the bronze medal match.

He is 5 foot 11 and weighs 183 lbs and played for the Montenegrin club Primorac Kotor.

Pasković was part of the Primorac team who participated in the 2009 water polo Euroleague Final Four held in Rijeka, which Primorac won.

He is currently playing for Galatasaray.

See also
 Montenegro men's Olympic water polo team records and statistics
 List of World Aquatics Championships medalists in water polo

References

External links
 

1985 births
Living people
People from Tivat
Montenegrin male water polo players
Olympic water polo players of Montenegro
Water polo players at the 2008 Summer Olympics
Water polo players at the 2012 Summer Olympics
Water polo players at the 2016 Summer Olympics
World Aquatics Championships medalists in water polo
Mediterranean Games bronze medalists for Serbia
Competitors at the 2005 Mediterranean Games
Mediterranean Games medalists in water polo
Universiade medalists in water polo
Universiade gold medalists for Serbia and Montenegro
Galatasaray S.K. (men's water polo) players